The F. A. Kennedy Steam Bakery is a  historic bakery at 129 Franklin Street in Cambridge, Massachusetts that first produced the Fig Newton in 1891.

History
The building was constructed in 1875.  The well-known baked good that originated at the Kennedy Steam Bakery was the Fig Newtons.  The bakery was purchased by Nabisco and later converted into an apartment building that is part of the University Park at MIT development. The Bakery building was added to the National Register of Historic Places in 1990.

See also
National Register of Historic Places listings in Cambridge, Massachusetts

References

External links
KBL Living

Commercial buildings completed in 1875
Industrial buildings and structures on the National Register of Historic Places in Massachusetts
Buildings and structures in Cambridge, Massachusetts
Bakeries of the United States
National Register of Historic Places in Cambridge, Massachusetts